James Hilton McManus (born 8 April 1992) is a badminton player from South Africa. He won silver at African Badminton Championships with his partner, Andries Malan.

Achievements

African Badminton Championships
Men's Doubles

References

External links 
 
 

1992 births
Living people
South African male badminton players